Grassy lake, also sometimes called Lake Grassy, is a long, narrow lake south of the city of Lake Placid, Florida. This lake's shore is 90% surrounded by development, mainly single-family housing. A small section of the southwest shore is bordered by U.S. Route 27.

Grassy Lake only has public access along the public right of way along US 27. There are no public boat ramps or no public swimming areas. No information is available about the types of fish in this lake.

References

Lakes of Highlands County, Florida
Lakes of Florida